Pandit Bhagwat Dayal Sharma Post Graduate Institute of Medical Sciences or PGIMS Rohtak is a government medical institution in the city of Rohtak, Haryana, India. The institute offers various under graduate and post graduate courses in major specialties of medicine and surgery. It is spread across a  campus. It is incorporated in Pandit Bhagwat Dayal Sharma University of Health Sciences.

Pt. It is one of the major Institutions for Medical Education and Research and a tertiary care centre for provision of specialized health care services not only to the people of the State of Haryana, but also to those of nearby states of Punjab, Rajasthan, Delhi and western U.P.

History
The institute was started under the name of Medical College, Rohtak in 1960.  For the first three years, the students were admitted to Government Medical College, Patiala which acted as a host Institution.  In 1963, the students were shifted to Rohtak.  In the subsequent years, multifaceted expansion measures have transformed the Institute into a fully developed center of Medical Education and research in all the major disciplines of Medicine.

After the establishment of Pandit Bhagwat Dayal Sharma University of Health Sciences in 2008, it was incorporated in the university.

Campus
The Institute Complex houses the following buildings:
 Medical College 
 Library and Reading Hall
 Sushruta Auditorium
 Ranbir Singh OPD
 Emergency Ward
 Well Equipped Hospital of 2100 beds
 Dhanwantari Apex Trauma Centre
 Modular OT cum ICU Complex
 Lala Shyamal Super-specialty Centre 
 Multi-slice whole body CT Scan building
 De-addiction center
 State Institute of Mental Health
 Mother and Child Hospital
 Dental College and Hospital
 Pharmacy College
 College of Nursing
 College of Physiotherapy
 Residential Area

Nearly 11,38,980 patients were provided consultation and treatment in the outpatient departments (OPD) during the year 2004–2005. Out of these, 68,000 patients were admitted as indoor patients. It witnessed a daily OPD throughput of nearly 14,000 patients in 2012 and is growing constantly. Nearly 1,50,000 surgeries were done in 2012. Its bed occupancy rate is more than 100%.

See also

 Similar institutes
 All India Institutes of Medical Sciences
 AIIMS, Badsa (Jhajjar)
 Pandit Deen Dayal Upadhayaya University of Health Sciences, Karnal
 List of institutions of higher education in Haryana
 List of medical colleges in India
Shri Krishna AYUSH University, Kurukshetra
 Related health topics
 Healthcare in India
 Indian states ranking by institutional delivery
 List of hospitals in India

References

Hospitals in Haryana
Medical colleges in Haryana
Teaching hospitals in India
Rohtak district
Hospitals established in 1960
1960 establishments in East Punjab